Personal Touch is an Australian television series which aired in 1966 on what would eventually become Network Ten. A monthly series, it was an interior decorating show featuring Jim Swartzman and Mary Mackay. In Sydney it aired at 3:00PM on Wednesdays, it was preceded on the schedule by Matinee Movie and followed by Owly's School. In Melbourne it aired at 3:30PM on Thursdays, preceded by Compass and followed by The Texan.

References

External links
Personal Touch on IMDb

1966 Australian television series debuts
1966 Australian television series endings
Network 10 original programming
English-language television shows
Black-and-white Australian television shows